Bala Velayat Rural District may refer to:
 Bala Velayat Rural District (Bakharz County)
 Bala Velayat Rural District (Kashmar County)
 Bala Velayat Rural District (Torbat-e Heydarieh County)